Lacmellea oblongata is a species of tree in the family Apocynaceae native to south-eastern Colombia, Ecuador and Peru. The tree is utilized for its edible fruit and latex.

References

External links
Lacmellea oblongata at useful Tropical Plants.

Rauvolfioideae
Flora of South America
Flora of Central America
Plants described in 1941